Alfred Hutchinson Dymond (August 21, 1827 – May 11, 1903) was a Canadian writer and politician.

Born in Croydon, England, the son of Henry Dymond, he emigrated to Canada in 1869. He was an editorial writer for the Toronto Globe (now the Toronto Globe and Mail after amalgamation). In 1874 he was elected to sit for York North in the Parliament of Canada. He was re-elected in a contested by-election in 1875 and continued to sit until being defeated in the general election of 1878.

He was appointed to the Agriculture Commission which published five volumes during his tenure as chief executive officer. In 1880 he was appointed principal of the Ontario School for the Blind.

Originally a Quaker, in 1852, Dymond married Helen Susannah Henderson, an Anglican, and later became active in the Anglican church. Dymond died in Brantford at the age of 75, and he was buried in St. James Cemetery in Toronto.

His daughter-in-law, Emma Stanton Mellish was one of the first two women to graduate from the University of Trinity College (later part of the University of Toronto).

Notes

External links 
 Biography at the Dictionary of Canadian Biography Online
 

1827 births
1903 deaths
English emigrants to Canada
Liberal Party of Canada MPs
Members of the House of Commons of Canada from Ontario
Burials at St. James Cemetery, Toronto